This is a list of all seasons played by Cambridge United in English football since the 1970–71 season, when the club were elected to the Football League. It details their record in every major competition entered, as well as the top goalscorers for each season.

The club currently play in League One, having been promoted from League Two in 2020/21 where they had competed since 2014, following their promotion back to the Football League after a 9-year absence, during which time they competed in the Football Conference.

The club has spent the following number of seasons at each level of the English football league system since its initial election:

 Seasons at level 2: 8
 Seasons at level 3: 11
 Seasons at level 4: 22
 Seasons at level 5: 9

The club's highest position ever is 5th in the Second Division in 1991–92, the last season before the establishment of the Premier League, a playoff position. They lost the semi-final to Leicester City 6–1 on aggregate and lost their chance to become founder members of the Premier League. Their lowest position has been 17th in the Football Conference (now National League) in 2006–07 and 2010–11.

Key

Key to divisions
 Division 1 – Football League First Division
 Division 2 – Football League Second Division
 Division 3 – Football League Third Division
 Division 4 – Football League Fourth Division
 League 2 – Football League Two
 Conference – Football Conference

Key to rounds
 PR – Preliminary round
 QR4 – Fourth qualifying round
 Group – Group stage
 R1 – First round, etc.
 QF – Quarter-finals
 SF – Semi-finals
 RU – Runner-up
 W – Winner

Key to positions and symbols
  – Champions
  – Runners-up
  – Promoted
  – Relegated
  – Competition not eligible to enter
  – Cambridge United did not enter the competition

Seasons

See also
 History of Cambridge United F.C.

Notes

References
General

Specific

 
Seasons
Cambridge United
Cambridge-related lists